24/7 is the first album by the pop singer-songwriter Dino. He wrote and arranged all the songs, produced the album, played keyboards and programmed drums. The album itself was certified gold by the RIAA. In 1989, 24/7 reached #34 on the Billboard 200 and #47 on the Top R&B/Hip-Hop Albums for Billboard.

In the US, five singles were released from the album. The first, "Summer Girls", appeared as a 12-inch single in 1987 on the independent label L.D. Records. It was re-released in 1988 after Dino had signed to 4th & B'way/Island/PolyGram Records, and reached a peak position of number 50 on the Billboard Hot 100. (These were released well before the album.) After the album was released in summer 1989, the title track, "24/7", peaked at number 42 on the Hot 100 and number 12 on the R&B chart. The third single, "I Like It", peaked at number 7, while reaching number 3 on the dance chart.  The single achieved gold sales status. The fourth track to be released, "Sunshine", peaked at number 23 on the pop chart and the last single, the ballad "Never 2 Much of U", peaked at number 61.

Track listing 

CD Edition

Production 
 Producer: Dino
 Engineers: Liz Cluse, Chris Fuhrman
 Mixing: Alan Meyerson
 Re-mixing: Frankie Anoble, R.O.B.
 Mastering: Herb Powers Jr.

Personnel 
 Dino – lead & backing vocals, keyboards, keyboard and drum programming
 Buzz Feiten, Paul Jackson Jr., Paul Pesco – guitars
 Jeff Lorber – keyboards, piano
 Keith Nelson – bass guitar
 R.O.B. – scratching, drum programming
 Paul Taylor – saxophone
 Linda Brown, Brian Bywaters – backing vocals

References 

1989 debut albums
Dino (singer) albums
4th & B'way Records albums